Antonio Díaz  was a Roman Catholic prelate who served as Apostolic Nuncio to Naples (1626–1627) and Bishop of Caserta (1616–1626).

Biography
Antonio Díaz was born in Naples, Italy.
On 18 May 1616, Antonio Díaz was appointed during the papacy of Pope Paul V as Bishop of Caserta.
On 5 June 1616, he was consecrated bishop by Maffeo Barberini, Bishop of Spoleto.
On 15 May 1626, he was appointed Apostolic Nuncio to Naples by  Pope Urban VIII.
He resigned as Bishop of Caserta two weeks later on 31 March 1626.
He served as Apostolic Nuncio to Naples until his resignation on 17 April 1627.

Episcopal succession
While bishop, he was the principal co-consecrator of:
Carlo Carafa, Bishop of Aversa (1616);
Lorenzo Campeggi, Bishop of Cesena (1624);
Basile Cacace,  Titular Archbishop of Ephesus and Auxiliary Bishop of Ravenna (1624); and
Antonio Marcello Barberini, Bishop of Senigallia (1625).

References

External links and additional sources
 (for Chronology of Bishops)
 (for Chronology of Bishops)
 (for Chronology of Bishops)

17th-century Italian Roman Catholic bishops
Bishops appointed by Pope Paul V
Bishops appointed by Pope Urban VIII
Apostolic Nuncios to the Kingdom of Naples